Mikhail Viktorovich Chalykh — (born November 20, 1983) is a retired Russian kickboxer. He is a Merited Master of Sports in kickboxing as well as a World Champion (2006), a European Champion (2004) and a three-time Russian National Champion in kickboxing (2004, 2005 and 2007).

Early life 
Mikhail Chalykh was born in Volgograd. At 16 years old, his childhood friend and future promoter, Maxim Voronov, introduced Chalykh to kickboxing at the gym of Viktor Petrovich Tuliev.

Career

Professional 
Chalykh started his professional career in 2004 and up until his first retirement in late 2007, he had only lost once in a close decision against Kickboxing legend, Dmitry Shakuta. Over his short professional career, he won the National WBKF (World BARS Kickboxing Federation) title three times. Additionally, in December, 2004, Chalykh knocked out two-time French National Champion in Kickboxing and Savate, Sylvio Danois for the WBKF European title. His most notable career wins came against WAKO World Full-Contact Champion Denis Grachev, Kickboxing and Muay Thai legend, Artem Levin, and Kickboxing legend, Artur Kyshenko.

WBKF World Championship 
In 2006, the WBKF organized a one-night 4-man tournament consisting of the best -76 kg fighters under their banner to fight for the WBKF World Championship. In the first round, Russian kickboxing great, WBKF Eurasian Champion, Vladimir Tyuin beat WAKO World Champion and WBKF Eurasian Champion, Kyrgyz, Katanbek Sydygaliev by unanimous decision. On the other side of the bracket, Chalykh beat two-time Ukrainian National Muay Thai Champion and 2006 I.F.M.A. World Championship gold medalist, Artur Kyshenko by split decision.

In the Final of the tournament, despite losing the first round, Chalykh came back from behind in the last round to win, again, by split decision. He had won his first, and only professional World title of his career.

Amateur 
As an amateur, Chalykh was a two-time World Champion (2002, 2005), a European Champion (2004) and four-time Russian National Champion (2002, 2006, 2007, 2011). His most notable tournament was in the 2005 World Championships where he beat L'houcine Ouzgni and Yuri Karbechou, whom he would lose to in the Final of the next European Tournament (2006), for the gold medal.

Retirement 
At the end of the year of 2007, after beating Draženko Ninić, Chalykh retired at 24 years old, with a record of 18–1, reportedly due to knee injuries.

Comebacks

2011 WAKO Russian National Tournament 
After four years away from the ring, Chalykh came back to compete in the WAKO Russian National Tournament heavier than he had ever been, at 81 kg. He stated that during his time off, he had healed his knees and fixed a tooth. According to himself, Chalykh started training for the tournament just three months before. He ran through his competition with relative ease and beat Murat Talipov in the Final to win his fourth amateur National title and last title amateur or professional.

Late career comebacks 
In 2014, Chalykh participated in the Amateur Volgograd Kickboxing Open, it was his first fight after over two years away from the sport.

In 2015, eight years after his last professional fight, at 31 years old, Chalykh decided to make his comeback heavier than he'd ever been at 85 kg against Moroccan, Samir Boukhidous on the undercard of Glory 20: Dubai. He lost by TKO in round 1 after getting knocked down twice.

After this, he returned to the Amateur ranks where he participated in the National Tournament. He went 2–1 in the tournament, losing his third fight by, reportedly, controversial decision. Chalykh decided to sit out 2016 and not go to the World Championships.

Two years after his last professional comeback, at 33 years old, Chalykh attempted another one as he had stated that he wants to fight in GLORY again. He was scheduled to face Filip Verlinden who had just challenged for the Enfusion Middleweight (85 kg) title. Chalykh won by unanimous decision. This was his first professional win in over ten years and it would be his last career win as he lost his last two fights in 2018 against Aurel Ignat and Belarusian Kickboxing Legend, Igor Bugaenko.

Titles 

 Professional
 2007 WBKF Russian Champion - 76 kg
 2006 WBKF World Champion - 76 kg
 2005 WBKF Low-Kick Russian Champion - 76 kg
 2004 WBKF European Champion - 76 kg
 2004 WBKF Russian Champion - 76 kg
 Amateur
 2011 WAKO Russian Champion - 81 kg
 2007 WAKO Russian Champion - 75 kg
 2006 WAKO Russian Champion - 75 kg
 2006 WAKO European Championship runner-up - 75 kg
 2005 WAKO World Muay Thai Champion - 75 kg
 2005 WAKO Russian Championship runner-up - 75 kg
 2004 WAKO European Champion - 81 kg
 2004 WAKO Russian Championship runner-up - 81 kg
 2002 WAKO Russian Champion - 75 kg
 2002 WAKO World Champion - 75 kg

Professional record

|-
|-  style="background:#fbb;" 
| 2018-05-30 || Loss ||align=left| Igor Bugaenko || Zhara Fight Show || Moscow, Russia|| Decision   || 3 || 3:00
|-  style="background:#fbb;" 
| 2018-02-24 || Loss ||align=left| Aurel Ignat || |ACB KB 13: From Paris with war  || Paris, France || Decision (Unanimous) || 3 || 3:00
|-  style="background:#cfc;"
| 2017-08-04 || Win ||align=left| Filip Verlinden || Fight Night Saint-Tropez || Saint-Tropez, France || Decision (Unanimous) || 3 || 3:00
|-  style="background:#fbb;" 
| 2015-04-03 || Loss ||align=left| Samir Boukhidous || Glory 20: Dubai || Dubai, UAE || TKO || - || -
|-  style="background:#cfc;"
| 2007-07-05 || Win ||align=left| Draženko Ninić || Rame uz rame || Budva, Montenegro || Decision (Split) || 5 || 3:00
|- style="background:#cfc;"
| 2007-02-21|| Win || align="left" | Kamil Yusupov || Arbat || Moscow, Russia || TKO || - || - 
|-
! colspan="9" style="background:white" |Wins 2007 WBKF -76 kg Russian title
|-  style="background:#cfc;" 
| 2006-12-20 || Win ||align=left| Vladimir Tyuin || Arbat, WBKF 4-man tournament Final || Moscow, Russia || Decision (Split)  || 3 || 3:00
|-
! colspan="9" style="background:white" |Wins 2006 WBKF -76 kg World title
|-  style="background:#cfc;" 
| 2006-12-20 || Win ||align=left| Artur Kyshenko || Arbat, WBKF 4-man tournament Semi-final || Moscow, Russia || Decision (Split)  || 3 || 3:00
|-  style="background:#cfc;" 
| 2006-10-24 || Win ||align=left| Artem Levin || Fighting the World || Novosibirsk, Russia || Decision (Unanimous) || 5 || 3:00
|-  style="background:#cfc;" 
| 2006-06-07 || Win ||align=left| Evgeniy Mityugin || Fight Club Arbat || Moscow, Russia || TKO || - || -
|-  style="background:#cfc;" 
| 2005-12-07 || Win ||align=left| Islam Tsomaev || Fight Club Arbat || Moscow, Russia || Decision (Split) || 3 || 3:00
|-
! colspan="9" style="background:white" |Wins 2005 WBKF Low-Kick -76 kg Russian title
|-  style="background:#cfc;" 
| 2005-05-04 || Win ||align=left| Dmitriy Kirpan || Fight Club Arbat || Moscow, Russia || KO || - || -
|-  style="background:#cfc;" 
| 2005-03-23 || Win ||align=left| Aleksandr Svitin || Fight Club Arbat || Moscow, Russia || Decision (Unanimous) || 3 || 3:00
|-  style="background:#cfc;" 
| 2004-12-08 || Win ||align=left| Silvio Danois || Fight Club Arbat || Moscow, Russia || KO (left cross) || 4 || -
|-
! colspan="9" style="background:white" |Wins 2004 WBKF -76 kg European title
|-  style="background:#cfc;" 
| 2004-11-17 || Win ||align=left| Katanbek Sydygaliev || Fight Club Arbat || Moscow, Russia || Decision (Unanimous) || 3 || 3:00
|-  style="background:#cfc;" 
| 2004-10-06 || Win ||align=left| Denis Grachev || Fight Club Arbat || Moscow, Russia || Decision (Split) || 3 || 3:00
|-  style="background:#cfc;" 
| 2004-08-25 || Win ||align=left| Islam Tsomaev || Fight Club Arbat || Moscow, Russia || Decision (Unanimous) || 3 || 3:00
|-  style="background:#cfc;" 
| 2004-07-14 || Win ||align=left| Abo Katamashvili || Fight Club Arbat || Moscow, Russia || TKO || - ||-
|-  style="background:#fbb;" 
| 2004-05-04 || Loss ||align=left| Dmitry Shakuta || "Kristall" Cup || Moscow, Russia  || Decision (Split) || 3 || 3:00
|-  style="background:#cfc;" 
| 2004-05-04 || Win ||align=left| Aleksey Kharkevych || "Kristall" Cup || Moscow, Russia  || Decision (Split) || 3 || 3:00
|-  style="background:#cfc;" 
| 2004-03-16 || Win ||align=left| Islam Tsomaev || "Kristall" Cup || Moscow, Russia  || Decision (Unanimous) || 3 || 3:00
|-  style="background:#cfc;" 
| 2004-03-16 || Win ||align=left| Islam Tsomaev || "Kristall" Cup || Moscow, Russia  || Decision (Unanimous) || 3 || 3:00
|-  style="background:#cfc;" 
| 2004-03-16 || Win ||align=left| Armen Azizyan || "Kristall" Cup || Moscow, Russia  || Decision (Unanimous) || 3 || 3:00
|-
| colspan=9 | Legend:

References

Russian male kickboxers
1983 births
Living people
Honoured Masters of Sport of the USSR
Sportspeople from Volgograd